Geurt Henk van Kooten (born 1969), known as George van Kooten, is a Dutch theologian. He is the Lady Margaret's Professor of Divinity at the University of Cambridge since 2018.

Born on 8 November 1969 in Delft, Netherlands, van Kooten completed a Master of Arts degree in New Testament studies from Durham University (St Chad's College) in 1995. In 1996 he earned another postgraduate degree in Jewish studies from the Oriental Institute at the University of Oxford. His doctorate, awarded in 2001, is from the University of Leiden.

He started his academic career as a lecturer at the University of Groningen (2002–2006). Subsequently he served the same school as Professor of New Testament and Early Christianity (2006–2018).

References

Leiden University alumni
Living people
Lady Margaret's Professors of Divinity
Academic staff of the University of Groningen
Alumni of Christ Church, Oxford
Fellows of Clare Hall, Cambridge
1969 births
Alumni of St Chad's College, Durham